is a Japanese romantic comedy and sports manga series written and illustrated by Kōji Miura. It has been serialized in Shueisha's Weekly Shōnen Jump since April 2021, with its chapters collected into nine tankōbon volumes as of February 2023.

Synopsis 
The series focuses on Taiki Inomata, a student at Eimei Junior and Senior High who is a member of the boys' badminton team. Every morning, he trains alongside his upperclasswoman and fellow crush Chinatsu Kano, who is on the girls' basketball team. However, Chinatsu moves in with Taiki's family when her parents leave Japan to work abroad. With Chinatsu now living with him, Taiki aims to slowly develop his relationship with her as they both strive to make it to the national championship with their respective teams.

Publication 
Blue Box is written and illustrated by Kōji Miura. The manga began its serialization in Shueisha's shōnen manga magazine Weekly Shōnen Jump in the 19th issue published on April 12, 2021. Shueisha has collected its chapters into individual tankōbon volumes. The first volume was released on August 4, 2021. As of February 3, 2023, nine volumes have been released.

On August 3, 2020, the one-shot version of Blue Box had been published on Weekly Shōnen Jump.

Blue Box has been licensed for simultaneous publication in North America as it is released in Japan, with its chapters being digitally launched by Viz Media on its Shonen Jump website. Shueisha also simulpublishes the series in English for free on the Manga Plus app and website. In February 2022, Viz Media announced that they had licensed the series in print format; the first volume was released on November 1 of the same year.

The manga is also licensed in Indonesia by Elex Media Komputindo.

Volume list

Chapters not yet in tankōbon format 
These chapters have yet to be published in a tankōbon volume.

Reception

Popularity 
In August 2021, the first volume of the manga had over 170,000 copies in circulation in less than a week after its release.

In June 2021, Blue Box was nominated for the seventh Next Manga Award in the Best Print Manga category; it placed 8th out of 50 nominees, but won the Global Prize. The series ranked 4th on the Nationwide Bookstore Employees' Recommended Comics of 2022.

Critical response 
Anthony Gramuglia of Comic Book Resources (CBR) stated, "Blue Box is a sentimental story about human connection. It's beautifully drawn, at times resembling a shōjo manga more than a typical shōnen. If Blue Box continues, it will likely become an earnest, sincere entry in Shōnen Jumps romantic catalog." Timothy Donohoo of CBR compared Blue Box to Kenta Shinohara's Witch Watch and Shigure Tokita's Don't Blush, Sekime-san! due to both series having concepts and romantic aspects similar to Blue Boxs.

See also 
 List of sports anime and manga

Notes

References

External links 
  
 
 
 

 Voiced manga
 One-shot version 
 Serialized version - first three episodes 

2021 manga
Badminton mass media
Basketball in anime and manga
Romantic comedy anime and manga
School life in anime and manga
Shōnen manga
Shueisha manga
Sports anime and manga
Viz Media manga